João Paulo de Figueiredo Tavares (born 30 March 1983) is a Brazilian male volleyball player. He was part of the Brazil men's national volleyball team at the 2010 FIVB Volleyball Men's World Championship in Italy. He played for CIMED SKY.

Clubs
 CIMED SKY (2010)

References

1983 births
Living people
Sportspeople from Minas Gerais
Brazilian men's volleyball players
Outside hitters